Mayavi Maling(Enchanted Malinga) also known as The Kings Daughters is a Hindi fantasy drama television series that premiered on Star Bharat on 1 May and ended on 18 August 2018.

Set in a fantasy world, the show features Neha Solanki, Vaani Sood and Gracy Goswami as the three princesses – Pranali, Eshwarya and Garima respectively. Actor Shakti Anand essays the role of the Shiladitya, princesses’ father and the King of Maling, whereas Harshad Arora, takes on the role of Angad, the powerful and evil Prince of Mahapuram, a neighbouring kingdom.

Cast

Main
 Neha Solanki as Maharani Pranali. Queen of the enchanted kingdom of Maling. Eshwarya and Garima's eldest sister, Angad's wife
 Harshad Arora as Yuvraj Angad. Prince of Mahapuram, Pranali's husband
 Aparna Kumar as Maharani Madhumali. Angad's mother, Queen of Mahapuram 
 Vaani Sood as Rajkumari Eshwarya. Princess of Maling, Pranali and Garima's sister, Chegu's love-interest
 Ankit Gupta as Chegu, Princess Eshwarya's love-interest
 Gracy Goswami as Rajkumari Garima. Youngest princess of Maling. Pranali and Eshwarya's sister

Recurring
 Shashwat Tripathi as Adivanth
 Gagan Singh as Arakh
 Shakti Anand as Maharaj Shiladitya, former King of Maling. Pranali, Eshwarya and Garima's father
 Parinita Seth as Maharani Vaidehi
 Preet Kaur Madhan as Queen Dharini
 Monaz Mevawala as Maharani Bhumi
 Preetika Chauhan as Antara
 Honey Makhani as Haran
 Ashlesha Sawant as Mandari
 Niyati Joshi as Rajmata
 Mamik Singh as Sardar Jaba (Cameo)
 Sargun Kaur Luthra as Maharani Pranali (Fake) (Cameo)

References

2018 Indian television series debuts
Hindi-language television shows
Indian drama television series
Star Bharat original programming
Indian fantasy television series